Thomas Nordgren (born 10 August 1956) is a Swedish basketball player. He competed in the men's tournament at the 1980 Summer Olympics.

References

1956 births
Living people
Swedish men's basketball players
Olympic basketball players of Sweden
Basketball players at the 1980 Summer Olympics
Sportspeople from Stockholm